Tiffany Stansbury (born January 16, 1983 in Philadelphia, Pennsylvania) is an American professional basketball player in the WNBA.

The daughter of former NBA player Terence Stansbury, Tiffany Stansbury attended college at NC State and graduated in 2006. Following her collegiate career, she was selected 29th overall in the 2006 WNBA Draft by the Houston Comets.

Stansbury spent the 2006 WNBA season with the Los Angeles Sparks, appearing in 4 games.  A late pre-season cut by the Sparks in 2007, Stansbury signed with Minnesota on May 25.

In 30 games with the Lynx, Stansbury averaged 4.3 points and 4.3 rebounds per game. Tiffany Stansbury also played 10 seasons in Europe (France, Italy, and Czech Republic) and Asia (Turkey).

Stansbury is married to Margot (Tracy) Stansbury

WNBA career statistics

Regular season

|-
| align="left" | 2006
| align="left" | Los Angeles
| 4 || 0 || 5.5 || .375 || .000 || .000 || 1.8 || 0.5 || 0.3 || 0.5 || 0.5 || 1.5
|-
| align="left" | 2007
| align="left" | Minnesota
| 30 || 14 || 14.6 || .458 || .000 || .513 || 4.3 || 0.5 || 0.4 || 0.4 || 1.0 || 4.3
|-
| align="left" | 2010
| align="left" | Los Angeles
| 5 || 0 || 2.8 || .333 || .000 || .500 || 0.0 || 0.0 || 0.2 || 0.0 || 0.4 || 0.6
|-
| align="left" | Career
| align="left" | 3 years, 2 teams
| 39 || 14 || 12.1 || .450 || .000 || .512 || 3.5 || 0.4 || 0.4 || 0.3 || 0.8 || 3.6

Playoffs

|-
| align="left" | 2006
| align="left" | Los Angeles
| 2 || 0 || 3.5 || .000 || .000 || .000 || 0.5 || 0.5 || 0.0 || 0.5 || 0.0 || 0.0
|-
| align="left" | Career
| align="left" | 1 year, 1 team
| 2 || 0 || 3.5 || .000 || .000 || .000 || 0.5 || 0.5 || 0.0 || 0.5 || 0.0 || 0.0

North Carolina State statistics
Source

Notes

External links
WNBA Player Profile
WNBA Prospect Profile

1983 births
Living people
Basketball players from Philadelphia
Centers (basketball)
Junior college women's basketball players in the United States
Los Angeles Sparks players
Minnesota Lynx players
NC State Wolfpack women's basketball players